Brian Fitzgerald (29 December 1927 – 3 July 2013) was an  Australian rules footballer who played with Geelong in the Victorian Football League (VFL).

Notes

External links 

1927 births
2013 deaths
Australian rules footballers from Victoria (Australia)
Geelong Football Club players